This is a list of all personnel changes for the 2018 Indian Premier League. This was the third season to have all players, apart from a selection of retained players, return to the auction pool (first in 2011, second in 2014)

Player retention

Retention policy
The eight teams could retain a maximum of five players from their squad, out of which only three could be retained during the retention period. The teams could also use a maximum of three right-to-match cards at the auction (a maximum of two, if the franchise retained three players during the retention period). The other restrictions on player retention were: a maximum of three capped Indian players could be retained, and only two overseas players and two uncapped Indian players could be retained. The salary deduction for every retained player from the franchise's salary purse was stipulated to be 15 crore, 11 crore and 7 crore if three players were retained; 12.5 crore and 8.5 crore if two players were retained; and 12.5 crore if only one player was retained. For retaining an uncapped player, salary deduction was set at 3 crore.

Chennai and Rajasthan, two franchises which were returning after serving a two-year suspension, were allowed to retain players from their respective 2015 squads who were not part of the squads of any of the other six teams in 2017. This meant that Chennai could retain from a pool of 13 players whereas Rajasthan had 6 players to choose from.

Retained players
The franchises were required to submit their retention lists by 4 January 2018. Player retention was broadcast live on Star Sports, making it the first time that player retention was telecasted.

Auction
The player auction for the 2018 Indian Premier League was held in Bangalore on 27 and 28 January 2018. The salary cap for the season was increased from 66 crore to 80 crore, with all franchises needing to spend at least 75 percent of the amount. In total 1122 players signed up to be a part of the auction. The team requested an addition of 9 players in the IPL longlist including Nepalese spinner Sandeep Lamichhane who became the first Nepalese to be listed in IPL auction. The list was shortlisted to the total of 578 players including 360 Indians. This was the first time that both capped and uncapped players were going to be auctioned on the same day. The shortlist included 62 capped Indians and 298 uncapped Indian cricketers along with 182 capped overseas cricketers, 34 uncapped overseas players and 2 cricketers from Associate Nations.
The players were divided in sets. Sets 1 and 2 consisted of marquee players such as Ravichandran Ashwin, Yuvraj Singh, Shikhar Dhawan, Chris Gayle and Ajinkya Rahane. Other players, were categorized according to the combination of capped or uncapped and their specialisation:

Summary
169 players (113 Indians and 56 Overseas) were sold at auction. Ben Stokes fetched the highest bid of ₹12.5 crore (US$1.95 million). Jaydev Unadkat was the most costly Indian player at ₹11.5 crore (US$1.80 million). Among uncapped players Krunal Pandya was most expensive at ₹8.8 crore(US$1.38 million). Many prominent players such as Lasith Malinga, Dale Steyn, Ishant Sharma, Hashim Amla and Joe Root remain unsold.
 Maximum overseas players: 8; Squad size- Min:18 and Max:25; Budget:₹80 Crore 
 Note: Associate players are not classified as either Capped or uncapped.

Sold players
The players from Set-1 to 11 were auctioned on Day 1. The players from Set-12 to 19 were auctioned on Day 2. Later in Day 2, players from Set-20 to 62 were auctioned through accelerated process. In later half, the remaining unsold and left players chosen by teams were recalled into auctioned. 64 players were called into Recall Round-1 and 15 into Recall Round-2.

Source:Vivo IPL 2018 Player Auction

Key to sets
 BA: Batsman
 FA: Fast bowler
 SP: Spin bowler
 AL: All-rounder
 M: Marquee player
 U: Uncapped player

 RTM: Players bought using Rights to Match Card.
 REC-1/2/1&2: Players unsold originally in their sets but brought back for Recall Round-1 or 2 or both.
 DI-REC-1/2/1&2: Players not called in accelerated process but were brought back for Recall Round-1 or 2 or both..
 Note 1: Abhishek Sharma was wrongly categorized in the Set-10-UWK1 in the shortlist was corrected in the auction.
 * : Players were in the squad for the season but did not play any match.
 0 : Players mentioned as 0 in IPL matches column were part of the squad but did not play any matches.

Unsold players
The following players remained unsold at the end of the two-day auction.

Key to sets
 BA: Batsman
 FA: Fast bowler
 SP: Spin bowler
 AL: All-rounder
 M: Marquee player
 U: Uncapped player

 NCA: Players who were not called for the auction during the accelerated process.
 LAT: Players who were not in the final shortlist of 578 but were added directly on the auction day.
 REC-1/2/1&2: Players unsold originally in their sets but brought back for Recall Round-1 or 2 or both.
 DI-REC-1/2/1&2: Players not called in accelerated process but were brought back for Recall Round-1 or 2 or both.
|  REP: Players not sold in the auction but later came as replacement player for sold players..
 Note 1: Harpreet Singh Bhatia was wrongly mentioned as having beenplayed 0 matches in the shortlist while actually he has played 4 matches in IPL.
 Note 2: Tamim Iqbal was wrongly mentioned as having been played not part of IPL in the shortlist while actually he was part of IPL 2012 for Pune Warriors but did not play any matches.
 Note 3: Jaskaran Singh was wrongly mentioned as having been played 8 matches in the shortlist while actually he was part of IPL 2012 for Rising Pune Supergiants but did not play any matches. His IPL record confuses him with Jaskaran Singh, a player of the same name who played for Deccan Charges in IPL 2009.
 * : Players were in the squad for the season but did not play any match.
 0 : Players mentioned as 0 in IPL matches column were part of the squad but did not play any matches.

Withdrawn players
The following players withdrew from the tournament either due to injuries or because of other reasons. Players were signed as replacement of contracted players who were not available to play due to injuries and national commitments. Under IPL rules, the replacements have to be chosen from the pool of players who went unsold in the auction, and cannot be paid more than the players they are replacing, though they can be paid less.

Support staff changes

References

External links

Indian Premier League personnel changes
Cricket player auction lists